Jameson's red rock hare (Pronolagus randensis) is a leporid found only on the continent of Africa, mostly in the southern portion of the continent. Zimbabwe and Namibia are thought to have the largest populations of the red rock hare and it is said to be found throughout both countries. South Africa has a population of this red rock hare but it is only found in the northwestern part of the country. Botswana also has a population in the Tswapong Hills.

Habitat
Jameson's red rock hare is found in very rocky environments, this is where it gets its name. This red rock hare is found on the rocky slopes of mountainous regions of the southern African continent. It is also found in grassy or bushy areas on or around these mountains and it uses them as its shelter during resting periods and sleep.

Description
This species has a fine, silky fur which is grizzled rufous-brown on the upper parts of the body. It has a whitish chin and slightly lighter fur on the ventrum. The sides of the neck, lower jaw and cheeks are light grey in colour. It has a large reddish-brown, black tipped tail. The large ears are sparsely haired and sometimes are tipped with black. When fully grown, this red rock hare can weigh more than 5 pounds.

Reproduction
Very little is known about its breeding habits. It is assumed that breeding can and does occur year around and females give birth to one to three young per litter.

Behavior
Active by night, this species remains in hiding during the day and therefore is nocturnal. Solitary in habits, although it is sometimes seen in groups consisting of a female and her young. An oestrus female is often followed by courting males as with other species.

Food
Jameson's red rock hare only feeds at night, when it is most active. It feeds on the vegetation and insects in and around its habitat including grasses, leaves, and certain fruits. As with other hares and rabbits, Jameson's red rock hare practices coprophagy in order to get the most nutrients out of its diet.

Human interaction and impact
Jameson's red rock hare is not on any endangered or threatened list. The habitat it uses, as with many other animals' habitats, is endangered because of human encroachment. The continent of Africa, even the region this species is found, is often war-torn and this may affect Jameson's red rock hare, its habitat, or both. Currently, though, the population of Jameson's red rock hare appears to be stable.

References

Pronolagus
Mammals described in 1907